"Work" is a song by Barbadian singer Rihanna from her eighth studio album, Anti (2016), featuring Canadian rapper Drake. The song was released as the lead single on January 27, 2016, through Westbury Road and Roc Nation. The song was written by the artists, PartyNextDoor, Monte Moir, Rupert "Sevn" Thomas, Allen Ritter, and producer Matthew "Boi-1da" Samuels, with additional production from Kuk Harrell and Noah "40" Shebib. The dancehall, reggae-pop, and R&B song, contains an interpolation of "If You Were Here Tonight" (1985) performed by Alexander O'Neal. Lyrically, the song incorporates themes of working for money, as well as discussing fragile relationships. The song is written in Jamaican Patois and Bajan Creole. Three of its writer-producers: Rupert "Sevn" Thomas, Matthew "Boi-1da" Samuels, and Jahron "PartyNextDoor" Brathwaite, are Jamaican-Canadians.

Critical response to "Work" was mixed upon release; critics praised its composition and Rihanna's decision to return to her earlier themes of dancehall music, while others were more skeptical of the song's potential as a comeback for the singer. Critical opinion improved over time; the song was included on several year-end lists and nominated for two awards at the 59th Grammy Awards: Record of the Year and Best Pop Duo/Group Performance. The song reached number one on the United States' Billboard Hot 100 chart, becoming Rihanna's fourteenth number-one single and making her the act with the fourth-most number-one songs on the chart (after The Beatles, Mariah Carey and Elvis Presley). The song remained at the top for nine weeks. The song also peaked at number one in nine additional countries and is certified Platinum or higher in thirteen countries, including 9× Platinum in the US, 3× Platinum in the UK and Diamond in France. It has also since sold 32.5 million units worldwide, making it one of the best-selling digital singles of all-time.

The song was accompanied by two music videos, which both premiered on February 22, 2016. The first of the two versions was directed by Rihanna's previous collaborator Director X, while the second was directed by Tim Erem. The song was further promoted with live performance's at the 2016 BRIT Awards which featured guest appearances from Drake and SZA, the 2016 MTV Video Music Awards, as well as being performed on the Anti World Tour. "Work" became the first dancehall song to top the Billboard Hot 100 since Rihanna's own "Rude Boy" (2010) and was succeeded three weeks later by another dancehall song, Drake's "One Dance".

Background and release
Following the release of Rihanna's seventh studio album, Unapologetic, and its accompanying tour, Rihanna took a step back from music.
Rihanna aimed to take a hiatus from recording music stating; "I wanted to have a year to just do whatever I want artistically, creatively," Rihanna went on to state that this hiatus lasted a week and she had returned to the recording studio. Following the release of three singles in 2015—"FourFiveSeconds" (with Kanye West and Paul McCartney), "Bitch Better Have My Money" and "American Oxygen"—Billboard announced that Rihanna was set to premiere a new single on January 27, 2016, at 8 am EST. That same day, "Work" premiered on several radio stations worldwide including the BBC Radio 1 in the United Kingdom. Subsequently, it was made available for digital download in most countries worldwide via the iTunes Store and was added for streaming on Apple Music, Spotify, and Tidal.

Writing and recording 
"Work" was written by PartyNextDoor, Drake, Rihanna, Monte Moir, Rupert "Sevn" Thomas, Allen Ritter and Matthew Samuels, and was produced by Boi-1da, Sevn Thomas, Ritter, Kuk Harrell and Noah "40" Shebib. In the summer of 2015, Thomas, Ritter, Boi-1da, and Martin Mason, among others, stayed at Drake's house in Los Angeles for a mid-week period. Thomas described the time spent at the home as a "beat factory, everyone was sitting there working and collaborating with each other."

Thomas created a beat which was dancehall-influenced; he later played it for Boi-1da to which he positively responded, "We're both Jamaican-Canadian. It was just something in our DNA, so it woke him up, and we started remembering all these old dancehall songs from the '90s." Boi-1da came with up idea for sampling an "old school dancehall rhythm" and after that the chords were made with Ritter and past it, "everything went organically". The most recognizable sampling found in the "Work" riddim is from the 1998 riddim "Sail Away" which was produced by Richie Stephens and Mikey 2000, interpolating Alexander O'Neal's "If You Were Here Tonight".

When the song's music was finished, Boi-1da sent it to PartyNextDoor who wrote the lyrics, "he's an incredible writer, and he's Jamaican as well. I think so that's how he's able to come up with those vibes and feels," noted Thomas. PartyNextDoor originally wrote the record as a breakup song, after Drake heard the song he loved it and decided to write and record a verse on it. The original reference track contained Braithwaite's vocals and a tweaked verse from Drake. It leaked as a snippet in February 2016, the full version was released online in April 2016. At first the intent was to keep the song as a collaboration between the two or give to Alicia Keys. Shortly after Braithwaite stayed at Rihanna's home in Malibu, where he played her the song, afterwards "it was all that she could sing around the house" and it was her "family's favourite song".

Rihanna's vocals were recorded by Marcos Tovar and Kuk Harrell at the Westlake Recording Studios in Los Angeles; the latter also served as a vocal producer. Drake's vocals were recorded by Noel Cadastre and Noah "40" Shebib at the Sandra Gale Studios in California and the SOTA Studios in Toronto. The vocal recording was assisted by Thomas Warren, while additional vocals were provided by PartyNextDoor. Manny Marroquin mixed "Work" at the Larrabee Studios, while Noel "Gadget" Campbell and Shebib did the mixing at the Studio 360 and SOTA Studios in Toronto. The mastering was done by Chris Gehringer at the Sterling Sound in New York City. "Work" marked the third collaboration between Rihanna and Drake, following "What's My Name?" in 2010 and "Take Care" in 2012.

Composition and lyrical interpretation 

"Work" is a dancehall, reggae-pop and R&B song, with a length of three minutes and thirty-nine seconds. Hugh McIntyre of Forbes described the song as "quite" urban and mixes hip hop influences with "island vibes". Zach Frydenlund of Complex wrote that the song "is slower and very rhythmic with Rihanna showing off her vocal skills over the crafty production." The song is written in the key of C# Dorian (same key signature as G minor) in common time with a tempo of 92 beats per minute. The vocals in the song span from F3 to E5. Alexa Camp of Slant Magazine called it "an understated midtempo jam in the vein of Janet Jackson's recent 'No Sleeep', with a percolating beat, sinuous synth lines, and vocal samples stretched and pulled in a way that recalls Jimmy Jam and Terry Lewis's masterful production work on Janet's 1997 album The Velvet Rope." The Guardian Harriet Gibsone wrote: "The glossy, modernist 'Work' skewers elements of dub and dancehall: her voice is at times Auto-Tuned, and a distant sample of what sounds a little like Grace Jones's "My Jamaican Guy" haunts its empty spaces."

Rolling Stone Daniel Kreps wrote the song contains "a tropical house vibe". In contrary, Taj Ran from Billboard wrote the song "isn't part of a new genre that many in the mainstream media are calling 'tropical house.' Anti lead single is undeniably drenched in dancehall, a genre with deep roots in Jamaica's club scene that spun off from reggae in the 1970s." According to The Atlantics Spencer Kornhaber, the single has "strangely unfinished quality" that features its verses, choruses and bridge fade into themselves, "forgoing soft-to-loud explosions or exciting rhythmic changes". He also noted that, Boi-1da also tries to create "escalation" in the song by adding additional drums for the second chorus, flutes, autotuned harmonies and back-off piano. The New York Times Jon Caramanica noted Rihanna at times "barely even relies on words, truncating her syllables past patois to something far less exact." Lyrically, "Work" is "about working for a paycheck no matter what else is going on in your life." Additionally, it focuses on "a fragile relationship" that can be seen in the lines, "If I get another chance to, I would never, oh never, neglect you," which Rihanna sings.

Reception 

"Work" has received mixed reviews from critics. Editor Joe Lynch wrote that the track finds Rihanna "reteaming with frequent collaborator/ex Drake, but that's the only predictable thing about this song—while it's hardly a 180-degree turn for Rih, its minimal production subverts expectations of what you'd expect a major pop star to release when they're gearing up to drop their long-delayed new album." Alexa Camp of Slant Magazine wrote: "the new track has the potential to at least partly justify the gold crown on the album's cover." BET's Kathy Iandoli called the song "comfortable, but still good." Spin's Brennan Carley thought Rihanna made the "lackadaisical song gel." Other critics were more skeptical. Hugh McIntyre of Forbes wrote "It's a well-produced song, but is it the pop hit that she needed?" Idolator's Robbie Daw's review was mixed, writing "Musically, the track is a charming, if also somewhat sparse, affair that feels like it blew in on a tropical, warm June wind and nestled up beside our ears."

Robin Reiff of The A.V. Club wrote: "the sheer repetition of the hook creates a built-in expiration date for when this song transitions from catchy to mildly annoying."
Taj Rani of Billboard stated "Work" has brought the genre of dancehall to the forefront of American music (again), as it became the first dancehall song to top the Billboard Hot 100 since Sean Paul's "Temperature" in 2006. She opined that the song is a prime example of "an unapologetic black woman proudly showing her heritage at a time when our politics are dominated by #BlackLivesMatter and Donald Trump's racist, xenophobic and misogynistic tirades." Rani continued to state that although mainstream critics are uncomfortable with Rihanna's use of patois (describing it as "gibberish"), she is able to display West Indian culture front and center without appropriation from mainstream culture.

Accolades
Rolling Stone named "Work" one of the 30 best songs of the first half of 2016: "What would even you call a minimalist banger? One of America's most reliable singles artists created an arch, moody album instead of a handful of chart-ready pop confections, but we still couldn't resist this barely-there tune with a beat like a dancehall wisp and lyrics like a freestyle."
The Guardian named it "Best track of 2016", writing: "Work was off-kilter, lacked a big chorus and weaved in a dubious 80s ballad. It also clicked perfectly, a song that captured two era-defining artists and one all the more infectious for its rule-defying restraint."
The British magazine NME named "Work" the best song of 2016 in their year-end critics' poll. NPR and Consequence of Sound both place the song at number fifteen on their year end lists. For Pitchfork it was the seventh best song of the year. Billboard ranked "Work" at number 25 on their "100 Best Pop Songs of 2016" list: "Its hypnotic chorus burrowing its way into the year's subconscious." In the annual Village Voices Pazz & Jop mass critics poll of the year's best in music in 2016, "Work" was tied at number 9, with David Bowie's "Blackstar".
"Work" has been nominated for the Best Pop Duo/Group Performance and the Record of the Year at the 59th Annual Grammy Awards."Work" won the awards for "R&B Song of the Year" and "Best Collaboration" at the 2017 iHeartRadio Music Awards.

Commercial performance 
In France, "Work" peaked at number one on the chart for two weeks, becoming Rihanna's sixth number-one in the country, the second-highest amount of all time. The single also broke the record for the most streams in a single week, with 2.056 million streams.

For the issue dated February 13, 2016, "Work" debuted at number nine on the US Billboard Hot 100 chart. It became the 27th top-ten hit for Rihanna and 15th for Drake. With this feat, Rihanna tied Mariah Carey, Janet Jackson and Elton John as the artists with the fifth-most top-ten songs on the chart. The singer scored 27 top-ten singles on the Hot 100 in a span of 10 years and eight months between her first single, "Pon de Replay" and "Work", and became the fastest solo artist to reach the plateau. It also became Rihanna's 50th song that charted on the Hot 100.

"Work" debuted at number one on the US Digital Songs chart with over 126,000 copies sold in only just over a day. It debuted at number nine on the Hot 100. "Work" launched at number 27 on the US Radio Songs chart with 44 million audience impressions and it is her highest debut. The song was most successful on the Hot R&B/Hip-Hop Songs chart where it debuted atop of it, becoming Rihanna's fifth chart-topper and Drake's fourteenth. The following week, "Work" sold an additional 156,000 copies and moved to number 7 on the Hot 100 chart. In its third week, "Work" reached number four on the Hot 100 chart and became Rihanna's 20th top-five hit, tying her with Michael Jackson and Stevie Wonder as the artists with the fifth-most top-five songs on the chart

In its fourth week, "Work" peaked at number one on the Hot 100 chart and became Rihanna's fourteenth number-one song in the United States. Subsequently, she became the artist with the fourth-most number-one songs on the chart following The Beatles with 20, Mariah Carey with 19 and Elvis Presley with 18 chart toppers. She broke a tie with Michael Jackson, who had reached 13 chart-toppers on the Billboard Hot 100 in his lifetime. Additionally, "Work" became Drake's second number-one single on the chart, the previous being the pair's 2010 collaboration, "What's My Name?". For the same issue, it rose to number 10 on the Radio Songs chart and became her 24th top-ten single, surpassing Mariah Carey's lead of 23 top-tens on that chart. The song remained at number-one on the Hot 100 for nine consecutive weeks and was unseated by Desiigner's "Panda". As of January 2021, "Work" has accumulated over 1.4 billion streams and 1,906,000 downloads in the United States.

Music video

Two music videos were released for the single; the first was directed by Director X who had previously worked with Rihanna on her debut video "Pon de Replay" while the second was directed by Tim Erem. Harv Glazer and Melissa Larsen served as a producer of the visual, while Daniel Bouquet and Alexi Zabes were the director of photography. Laura McMillan and Nick Rondeau were the editors of the video, while Nick Cortes served as the production coordinator. Missy Galanida, Isaac Rice and Taj Critchlow, served as the videos executive producers while Dave Hussey of Company 3 was the colorist.

Rihanna later announced its premiere date to be February 22, 2016 via her Twitter account, while also releasing a videoclip via YouTube.
Filming of the first accompanying music video took place at the Real Jerk restaurant in Toronto on February 5.
Director X stated that when filming the video they wanted to make it look like they were in a West Indian neighborhood, in a West Indian restaurant.
The second video for the single directed by Tim Erem was discussed between the director, Rihanna and Drake in the studio at 4 a.m., where they were attempting to come up with ideas to add a tropical vibe to their already existing footage. After thirty minutes they came up with the idea of shooting a video in a whole pink room.

The first video opens with a shot of "The Real Jerk" carpark, in which Rihanna and Drake enter separately. The shot switches to Rihanna dancing in the nightclub, in front of a mirror. Drake enters the scene in which he raps. The video ends with credits written in a red, green and yellow typeface. The second video is shot in one piece, as it shows Rihanna and Drake in a room full of neon pink lights and styled with sofas and house plants aesthetics.
Hazel Cills of MTV noted Rihanna's and Drake's chemistry as "playful and confrontational", which was "ultimately made for the viewer's pleasure". Cills continued to state that the second video "luxuriates in our voyeurism." Christopher Hooton from The Independent also picked upon the videos sense of voyeurism and compared the second video to Drake's previous single "Hotline Bling" and Nicki Minaj's "Anaconda".
Popsugar called the songs accompanying videos "relatively simple," but stated they were an "instant classics", while RollingStone noted the videos as being "steamy".

"Work" was nominated for the "Video of the Year" award as the 2016 BET Awards, as well as being nominated for the "Best Female Video" award as the 2016 MTV Video Music Awards. Time Magazine listed the video at number eight on their Top 10 Pop Music Videos of 2016, while Pitchfork Media placed it at number twenty-five on their list of The Best Music Videos of 2016. As of June 2018, the video has received over 1.0 billion views on YouTube.

Performances and remixes 
Rihanna performed "Consideration" with SZA and "Work" with Drake live for the first time at the 2016 Brit Awards on February 24, 2016. It was Rihanna's first appearance to promote the album with a live performance. "Work" was also included on her Anti World Tour (2016), as well as being performed along with Too Good at OVO Fest with Drake in Toronto on July 31, 2016. Rihanna also performed the song at the 2016 MTV Video Music Awards. She performed the song as part of her set during the halftime show of Super Bowl LVII.

On February 9, 2016, rapper ASAP Ferg released his remix of "Work" via SoundCloud.
On February 17, 2016, Nigerian artist Burna Boy released his remix of "Work" along with a lyric video.
On March 6, 2016, American rapper Lil Mama, released a remix of the song. Lil Mama's version featured the same production and chorus but was accompanied by new rap verses. Lil Mama's version was also released with a video, in which she recreated the original video along with choreographed dance moves.

On March 8, 2016, DJDS released an '80s-inspired remix via SoundCloud.
On March 19, 2016, Work (Remixes) EP was officially released via Tidal Including R3HAB REMiX (Extended Remix and Extended Instrumental), Burns' Late Night Rollin' Remix, Bad Royale Remix (Bad Royale Remix), and Lost Kings Remix (and Extended Remix). American producers Ookay & Yultron released a remix of the song as well, giving it a hybrid trap-inspired beat. The remix was released via SoundCloud on Yultron's page.

Track listing

Credits and personnel 

Credits adapted from Rihanna's official website.

Locations
 Recorded at Westlake Beverly Recording Studios in Los Angeles, California, Sandra Gale Studios, California and SOTA Studios, Toronto
 Mixed at Studio 306 and SOTA Studios in Toronto, Canada and Larrabee Studios in Universal City, California
 Mastering at Sterling Sound Studios in New York City, New York

Personnel

 Rihanna – vocals, writing
 Drake – vocals, writing
 Jahron Brathwaite – writing, additional vocals
 Boi-1da – writing, production
 Allen Ritter – writing
 Sevn Thomas – writing
 Monte Moir – writing (interpolation)
 Marcos Tovar – vocal recording
 Kuk Harrell – vocal recording, vocal production
 Thomas Warren – vocal recording
 Noel Cadastre – vocal recording
 Noel "Gadget" Campbell – mixing
 Noah "40" Shebib – vocal production, vocal recording, mixing
 Manny Marroquin – mixing
 Chris Gehringer – mastering

Charts

Weekly charts

Year-end charts

Decade-end charts

Certifications

Release history

See also 
 Artists with the most number-ones on the U.S. Hot 100
 List of best-selling singles
 List of Canadian Hot 100 number-one singles of 2016
 List of number-one hits of 2016 (France)
 List of UK R&B Singles Chart number ones of 2016
 List of Billboard Hot 100 number-one singles of 2016
 List of number-one singles of 2016 (South Africa)
 List of number-one dance singles of 2016 (U.S.)

References 

2016 singles
2016 songs
Rihanna songs
Drake (musician) songs
Billboard Hot 100 number-one singles
Canadian Hot 100 number-one singles
Number-one singles in Denmark
SNEP Top Singles number-one singles
Number-one singles in Portugal
South African Airplay Chart number-one singles
Music videos directed by Director X
Song recordings produced by Boi-1da
Songs written by Drake (musician)
Songs written by PartyNextDoor
Songs written by Rihanna
Songs written by Boi-1da
Songs written by Monte Moir
Reggae fusion songs
Songs about labor
Torch songs
Dancehall songs
Songs written by Allen Ritter
Songs written by Sevn Thomas
Roc Nation singles